The 1956 United States Senate election in Missouri took place on November 6, 1956 in Missouri. The incumbent Democratic Senator, Thomas C. Hennings Jr., was re-elected. He defeated Republican nominee Herbert Douglas, winning 56.4% of the vote. Hennings outperformed Democratic presidential nominee Adlai Stevenson II, who won 50.1% in the presidential election in Missouri.

Democratic primary

Candidates
 Thomas C. Hennings Jr., the incumbent Senator
 Tom J. Gavin, Kansas City councilman (withdrew prior to election, but name still on ballot)

Results

Republican primary

Candidates
 Herbert Douglas, attorney and candidate for Missouri Attorney General in 1948
 Albert E. Schoenbeck, attorney
 William E. Van Taay, director of economics and sociology at Fontbonne University
 William McKinley Thomas, furniture warehouse employee

Results

Results

References

1956
Missouri
United States Senate